Osvaldo Alexis González Sepúlveda (born August 10, 1984) is a Chilean footballer. He currently plays for Chilean club Huachipato.

Club career
A product of the Universidad de Concepción youth system, González began playing in the club's youth squad. He later debuted for the senior squad in 2005, and soon after became a regular starter. He then signed with Universidad de Chile. On January 9 he was transferred to Toluca of México. On May 15, 2010 he received two yellow cards in the semifinal of the second leg of El Bicentenario 2010. Due to his red card he missed the first leg of the final which Toluca eventually won. After a year and a half in Mexico, Osvaldo finally returned to Universidad de Chile in July 2011. He scored the equalizer goal of the game against Vasco da Gama in the semifinals of the 2011 Copa Sudamericana, which Universidad de Chile finished as champion.

International career
He has been capped for the Chile senior team fourteen times. 
In addition, he represented Chile U23 at the 2008 Inter Continental Cup in Malaysia.

Career statistics

Honours

Club
Universidad de Chile
Primera División de Chile (4): 2009–A, 2011–C, 2012–A, 2014–A
Copa Chile (1): 2012–13, 2015
Copa Sudamericana (1): 2011
Supercopa de Chile (1): 2015

Toluca
Liga MX (1): 2010 Torneo Bicentenario

References

External links

1987 births
Living people
People from Concepción, Chile
Chilean footballers
Chilean expatriate footballers
Chile international footballers
Chilean Primera División players
Liga MX players
Universidad de Concepción footballers
Universidad de Chile footballers
C.D. Huachipato footballers
Deportivo Toluca F.C. players
Expatriate footballers in Mexico
Chilean expatriate sportspeople in Mexico
Sportspeople from Concepción, Chile
Association football defenders
21st-century Chilean people